Elina Gasanova (born 21 July 1989) is a retired Azerbaijani-born Russian tennis player.

Gasanova won six doubles titles on the ITF Circuit in her career. On 26 July 2010, she reached her best singles ranking of world No. 581. On 24 August 2009, she peaked at No. 362 in the WTA doubles rankings.

Playing for Azerbaijan in Fed Cup competition, Gasanova has a win–loss record of 2–4.

She retired from professional tennis 2010.

ITF finals

Singles: 1 (0–1)

Doubles: 11 (6–5)

References

External links
 
 
 

Azerbaijani female tennis players
Russian female tennis players
Azerbaijani emigrants to Russia
Sportspeople from Baku
Living people
1989 births